The longclaws are a genus, Macronyx, of small African passerine birds in the family Motacillidae.

Longclaws are slender, often colorful, ground-feeding insectivores of open country. They are ground nesters, laying up to four speckled eggs. They are named for their unusually long hind claws, which are thought to help in walking on grass. There are only between 10,000 and 19,000 Sharpe's longclaw left in Kenya.

The genus Macronyx was introduced by the English naturalist William John Swainson in 1827 with the Cape longclaw as the type species. The name combines the Classical Greek words  "long" or "great" and  "claw".

Species list
The genus contains eight species:

References

External links
Longclaw videos on the Internet Bird Collection

Macronyx